Nith is one of the thirteen wards used to elect members of the Dumfries and Galloway Council. It elects four Councillors.

Councillors

Election Results

2017 Election
2017 Dumfries and Galloway Council election

2012 Election
2012 Dumfries and Galloway Council election

2007 Election
2007 Dumfries and Galloway Council election

References

Wards of Dumfries and Galloway